= Kalbasi =

Kalbasi is an Iranian surname.

Notable people surnamed Kalbasi include the following:

- Ayatollah Mohammad Ibrahim Kalbasi Ashtari (1766–1845), Iranian jurist and master of jurisprudence and religious sciences
